Games played (most often abbreviated as G or GP) is a statistic used in team sports to indicate the total number of games in which a player has participated (in any capacity); the statistic is generally applied irrespective of whatever portion of the game is contested. In baseball, the statistic applies also to players who, before a game, are included on a starting lineup card or are announced as ex ante substitutes, whether or not they play; however, in Major League Baseball, the application of this statistic does not extend to consecutive games played streaks. A starting pitcher, then, may be credited with a game played even if he is not credited with a game started or an inning pitched. The right fielder (RF) is one of the three outfielders, the defensive positions in baseball farthest from the batter. The right field is the area of the outfield to the right of a person standing at home plate and facing toward the pitcher's mound. The outfielders must try to catch long fly balls before they hit the ground or to quickly catch or retrieve and return to the infield any other balls entering the outfield. The right fielder must also be adept at navigating the area of right field where the foul line approaches the corner of the playing field and the walls of the seating areas. Being the outfielder farthest from third base, the right fielder often has to make longer throws than the other outfielders to throw out runners advancing around the bases, so they often have the strongest or most accurate throwing arm. The right fielder normally plays behind the second baseman and first baseman, who play in or near the infield; unlike catchers and most infielders (excepting first basemen), who are virtually exclusively right-handed, right fielders can be either right- or left-handed. In the scoring system used to record defensive plays, the right fielder is assigned the number 9, the highest number.

Because game accounts and box scores often did not distinguish between the outfield positions, there has been some difficulty in determining precise defensive statistics before 1901; because of this, and because of the similarity in their roles, defensive statistics for the three positions are frequently combined. However, efforts to distinguish between the three positions regarding games played during this period and reconstruct the separate totals have been largely successful; players whose totals include pre-1901 games are notated in the table below. Roberto Clemente is the all-time leader in career games played as a right fielder with 2,305. Paul Waner (2,250), Harry Hooper (2,183), Hank Aaron (2,174), Mel Ott (2,161), Tony Gwynn (2,144), Dwight Evans (2,092), Nick Markakis (2,074), Al Kaline (2,031), Willie Keeler (2,019), and Sammy Sosa (2,015) are the only other players to appear in over 2,000 games in right field in their careers.

Key

List

Stats updated through the 2022 season

Other Hall of Famers

References

External links

Major League Baseball statistics
Games played as a right fielder